Gholam Reza Aghazadeh  (born 15 March 1949 in Khoy, Iran) is an Iranian politician. Aghazadeh served as the Vice President for Atomic Energy of the Islamic Republic of Iran and the president of the Atomic Energy Organization of Iran from September 1997 until his resignation in July 2009. He is currently member of the Expediency Discernment Council.

He has a Bachelor of Science in Accounting and Computer Engineering from University of Tehran. He was an active member of the opposition, and in 1979 he became a director of the ultra-populist IRP newspaper Jomhouri Eslami, run by Mir-Hossein Mousavi. In 1980, Mousavi became foreign minister and made Aghazadeh his deputy in charge of economic relations and finance.

Two years later, as Mousavi became prime minister, Aghazadeh was made state minister for executive affairs, a post attached to the prime minister's office. Later he held the title of deputy prime minister for executive affairs in charge of Iran's oil barter deals with foreign states and companies under a countertrade system started in 1982. He coordinated policies of various ministries through the PM's office. His talents earned him the post of Iran's Minister of Petroleum in October 1985. He held this position until 1997 when he was replaced by Bijan Namdar Zanganeh after the election of the reformist president Mohammad Khatami. He was then promoted to the post of Vice President for Atomic Energy. He held this position from 1997 to 2009. 

On 16 July 2009, the semi-official Iranian Students News Agency reported that Gholam Reza Aghazadeh had resigned as Iran's Nuclear Chief for unspecified reasons, a resignation of intense interest in such a difficult time. There has been speculation that he resigned following shutdowns and failures in Iran's nuclear program caused by the Stuxnet virus.

See also
Hassan Rowhani
Ali Larijani
Saeed Jalili
Mahmoud Ahmadinejad
Mohammad Khatami
Atomic Energy Organization of Iran

References

External links

Iranian nuclear chief steps down, BBC News, 16 July 2009
Gholamreza Aghazadeh

|-

1949 births
Living people
20th-century Iranian engineers
University of Tehran alumni
Nuclear program of Iran
People from Khoy
Oil ministers of Iran
Members of the Expediency Discernment Council
Islamic Republican Party politicians
Presidents of the Atomic Energy Organization of Iran
Executives of Construction Party politicians
21st-century Iranian politicians